Crepis monticola is a North American species of flowering plant in the family Asteraceae known by the common name mountain hawksbeard.

Distribution
This aster-like flower is native to northern California and southern Oregon, in the Klamath Mountains and Northern California Coast Ranges.

It grows in woodlands and dry Yellow pine forest and Red fir forest habitats.

Description
Crepis monticola is a taprooted perennial which rarely exceeds 30 centimeters (12 inches) in height. The dense foliage is made up of highly lobed and toothed leaves forming a wrinkled, bristly clump. It is often covered in sticky exudate.

The inflorescence is a cluster of several flower heads, each made up of about 20 golden yellow ligules with toothed tips, but no disc florets.

The fruit is a small achene with a white pappus.

References

External links
Calflora Database: Crepis monticola (Mountain hawk's beard)
Jepson Manual eFlora (TJM2) treatment of Crepis monticola
USDA Plants Profile for Crepis monticola (mountain hawksbeard)
UC Calphotos gallery

monticola
Flora of California
Flora of Oregon
Flora of the Klamath Mountains
Natural history of the California Coast Ranges
Plants described in 1896
Flora without expected TNC conservation status